The 1997 Women's Mazda World Open Squash Championship was the women's edition of the 1997 World Open, which serves as the individual world championship for squash players. The event took place in Sydney in Australia during October 1997. Sarah Fitzgerald won her second World Open title, defeating Michelle Martin in the final.

Seeds

Draw and results

See also
World Open
1997 Men's World Open Squash Championship

References

External links
Womens World Open

World Squash Championships
1997 in squash
1997 in Australian sport
Sports competitions in Sydney
1990s in Sydney
Squash tournaments in Australia
1997 in women's squash
International sports competitions hosted by Australia
October 1997 sports events in Australia